Danny Hill Comden is an American actor, director, film producer and writer. He is best known for playing Stevie Hanson in the ABC sitcom I'm with Her, Blake in Urban Legend and Roger Nicholl in Pretty Persuasion. He wrote and directed Sol Goode, in which he also starred. He also appeared in Father of Invention, Dunston Checks In, Breakin' All the Rules and ''Dirt.

Filmography

References

External links 
 

American male film actors
American film producers
American male screenwriters
Living people
1969 births
American male television actors
20th-century American male actors
21st-century American male actors
Male actors from Beverly Hills, California
Film directors from California
Film producers from California
Screenwriters from California